Inverroy  is a scattered village, situated 2 miles east of Spean Bridge, in Inverness-shire, Scottish Highlands and is in the Scottish council area of Highland.

References

Populated places in Lochaber